Masonic shogi is a shogi variant invented by George R. Dekle Sr. in 1987. The game is played on a modified shogi board whereby alternating  are indented to the right—resembling masonry brickwork. The moves of pieces are adapted to the new geometry; in other respects the game is the same as shogi.

Masonic shogi was included in World Game Review No. 10 edited by Michael Keller.

Board characteristics
Indentation of alternating ranks results in cants (oblique files) approximately 30 degrees from the vertical and diagonals approximately 30 degrees from the horizontal, the same as hexagon-based chessboards when cell vertices face the players. (For example, rooks have six directions of movement. Masonic bishops, however, are limited to the four diagonal directions to the sides.)

Game rules
All normal shogi rules apply, including initial setup (see diagram), drops, promotion, and so on. The pieces, however, have specially defined moves.

Piece moves
The diagrams show how the unpromoted pieces move. As in shogi, a dragon king (promoted rook) moves as a rook or as a king. A dragon horse (promoted bishop) moves as a bishop or a king.

See also
 De Vasa's hexagonal chess
 Also by George Dekle:
 Masonic Chess
 Hexshogi – a variant with hexagonal cells
 Trishogi – a variant with triangular cells
 Space Shogi – a 3D variant

Notes

References

Bibliography

Board games introduced in 1987
Abstract strategy games
Shogi variants